The Osaka movie theatre fire took place on 1 October 2008, before dawn. As a result of an act of arson, sixteen victims died and nine were injured.

Incident
The fire took place at a pornographic video theatre in downtown Osaka. The business, called Cats, rented out 32 small rooms, which, the New York Times reported, cost $15 a night. There were 26 customers and three employees in the store when the fire began.

Some 120 firefighters fought the blaze and extinguished it in 90 minutes. The theatre rooms, each equipped with a cot, were used as a cheap hotel by customers. The rooms in the video store were located in a narrow hallway with only a single exit via the reception. There were no sprinklers or smoke ventilation, and the video's manager turned off the alarm after the fire broke out as he thought it was a false alarm.

Motive, trial, sentencing
The perpetrator, Kazuhiro Ogawa, told police he started the fire after deciding to kill himself. But he got scared, and ran away as smoke filled his room. Ogawa said he was depressed because he was living on welfare and that he "thought my life would be meaningless". Despite initially admitting the allegations, Ogawa pleaded innocent saying "I did not commit arson" at his trial. Ogawa was sentenced to death in 2009. Ogawa's death sentence was upheld by the Osaka High Court in 2011. In 2014, the Supreme court rejected Ogawa's appeal, judge Tomoyuki Yokota stated that Ogawa's actions caused "an extremely large number of casualties is serious, and the impact and anxiety on society is great" and that "There is no reason to consider the motives and circumstances behind the decision to commit suicide." As of 2022, Ogawa awaits execution on death row.

References

2008 crimes in Japan
Arson in Japan